Lyuba Vinogradova (born 1973) is a Russian historian. She was born in Moscow and obtained a PhD in microbiology from the Moscow Agricultural Academy. She then turned to the study of foreign languages, and helped Antony Beevor with research for his magnum opus Stalingrad (1995). She has since co-authored a book on Vasily Grossman with Beevor. She has also worked with historians Simon Sebag Montefiore and Max Hastings. Her own titles on the Russian front in the Second World War include Avenging Angels and Defending the Motherland.

References

21st-century Russian historians
1973 births
Living people